The expulsion of Germans from Czechoslovakia after World War II was part of a series of evacuations and deportations of Germans from Central and Eastern Europe during and after World War II.

During the German occupation of Czechoslovakia, the Czech resistance groups demanded the deportation of ethnic Germans from Czechoslovakia. The decision to deport the Germans was adopted by the Czechoslovak Government-in-Exile which, beginning in 1943, sought the support of the Allies for this proposal. The final agreement for the expulsion of the German population however was not reached until 2 August 1945 at the end of the Potsdam Conference.

In the months following the end of the war, "wild" expulsions happened from May until August 1945. Czechoslovak President Edvard Beneš on 28 October 1945 called for the "final solution of the German question" which would have to be solved by deportation of the ethnic Germans from Czechoslovakia.

The expulsions were carried out by order of local authorities, mostly by groups of armed volunteers. However, in some cases it was initiated or pursued with the assistance of the regular army. Several thousand died violently during the expulsion and more died from hunger and illness as a consequence. The expulsion according to the Potsdam Conference proceeded from 25 January 1946 until October of that year. Roughly 1.6 million ethnic Germans were deported to the American zone (West Germany), and an estimated 800,000 were deported to the Soviet zone (East Germany).

The expulsions ended in 1948, but not all Germans were expelled; estimates for the total number of non-expulsions range from approximately 160,000 to 250,000.

The West German government in 1958 estimated the ethnic German death toll during the expulsion period to be about 270,000, a figure that has been cited in historical literature since then. Research by a joint German and Czech commission of historians in 1995 found that the previous demographic estimates of 220,000 to 270,000 deaths were overstated and based on faulty information; they concluded that the actual death toll was at least 15,000 persons, and that it could range up to a maximum of 30,000 dead if one assumes that some deaths were not reported. The Commission statement also said that German records show 18,889 confirmed deaths including 3,411 suicides. Czech records indicated 22,247 deaths including 6,667 unexplained cases or suicides.

The German Church Search Service was able to confirm the deaths of 14,215 persons during the expulsions from Czechoslovakia (6,316 violent deaths, 6,989 in internment camps and 907 in the USSR as forced laborers).

Plans to expel the Sudeten Germans 

Following the Munich Agreement of 1938, and the subsequent Occupation of Bohemia and Moravia by Hitler in March 1939, Edvard Beneš set out to convince the Allies during World War II that the expulsion of ethnic Germans was the best solution. Expulsion was even supported by Czechs who had moderate views about the Germans. The pro-Nazi Sudeten German Party had gained 88% of ethnic German votes in May 1938.

Almost as soon as German troops occupied the Sudetenland in October 1938, Edvard Beneš and, later, the Czechoslovak Government-in-Exile, pursued a twofold policy: the restoration of Czechoslovakia to its pre-Munich boundaries, and the removal, through a combination of minor border rectifications and population transfer, of the state's German minority, so as to bolster the territorial integrity of state. Although the details changed, along with British public and official opinion, and pressure from Czech resistance groups, the broad goals of the Czechoslovak Government-in-Exile remained the same throughout the war.

The pre-war policy of minority protection was viewed as counterproductive (and the minorities themselves seen as the source of unrest and instability), because it was associated with the destruction of the  Czechoslovak state and its democratic régime. Therefore, Czechoslovak leaders  made a decision to change the multi-ethnic character of the state to a state of two or three ethnicities (Czechs, Slovaks and, initially, Ruthenians). That goal was to be reached by the expulsion of most of the other minority groups and the successive assimilation of the rest. Because almost all people of German and Magyar ethnicity gained German or Hungarian citizenship during the occupation of Czechoslovakia, the expulsion could be legalized as the banishment of foreigners.

On 22 June 1942, after plans for the expulsion of the Sudeten Germans had become known, Wenzel Jaksch (a Sudeten German Social Democrat in exile) wrote a letter to Beneš protesting about the proposed plans.

Initially, only a few hundred thousand Sudeten Germans were to be affected — people who were perceived as being disloyal to Czechoslovakia and who, according to Beneš and Czech public opinion, had acted as Hitler's "fifth column". Due to the escalation of Nazi atrocities in the Protectorate as the war progressed, there were increasing demands by the Czechoslovak Government-in-Exile, Czech resistance groups, and the majority of Czechs, for the expulsion of more and more Germans, with no individual investigations or inference of guilt on their part. The only exception were to be 160,000 to 250,000 ethnic German "anti-fascists", and those ethnic Germans crucial for industries. The Czechs and their government did not want a future Czechoslovakia to be burdened with a sizable German minority.

The idea of expelling ethnic Germans from Czechoslovakia was supported by the British Prime Minister Winston Churchill and Britain's Foreign Secretary Anthony Eden. In 1942, the Czechoslovak Government-in-Exile received the formal support of the United Kingdom for the expulsion of Germans from Czechoslovakia and, in March 1943, President Beneš received Moscow's support. In June 1943, Beneš traveled to Washington, D.C., and obtained support for the evolving expulsion plans from President Franklin D. Roosevelt.

During the German occupation of Czechoslovakia, especially after the Nazis' brutal reprisal for the assassination of Heydrich, most of the Czech resistance groups demanded the final solution of the German question, which would have to be achieved by transfer or expulsion. Those demands were adopted by the Government-in-Exile which, beginning in 1943, sought the support of the Allies for the proposal. The April 1945 Košice Program, which outlined the postwar political settlement of Czechoslovakia, stipulated an expulsion of Germans and Hungarians from the country. The final agreement for the transfer of the German minority however was not reached until 2 August 1945 at the end of the Potsdam Conference.

Sir Geoffrey Harrison, who drafted article XIII of the Potsdam Communique concerning the expulsions, wrote on 31 July 1945 to John Troutbeck, head of the German Department at the Foreign Office: "The Sub-Committee met three times, taking as a basis of discussion a draft which I circulated ... Sobolov took the view that the Polish and Czechoslovak wish to expel their German populations was the fulfilment of an historic mission which the Soviet Government were unwilling to try to impede. ... Cannon and I naturally strongly opposed this view. We made it clear that we did not like the idea of mass transfers anyway. As, however, we could not prevent them, we wished to ensure that they were carried out in as orderly and humane manner as possible". (FO 371/46811, published in facsimile in A. de Zayas, Nemesis at Potsdam, pp. 232–34).

Germans in Czechoslovakia at the end of the war 

Developing a clear picture of the expulsion of Germans from Czechoslovakia is difficult because of the chaotic conditions that existed at the end of the war. There was no stable central government and record-keeping was non-existent. Many of the events that occurred during the period were spontaneous and local rather than being the result of coordinated policy directives from a central government. Among these spontaneous events was the removal and detention of the Sudeten Germans which was triggered by the strong anti-German sentiment at the grass-roots level and organized by local officials.

According to the Schieder commission, records of food rationing coupons show approximately 3,070,899 inhabitants of occupied Sudetenland in January 1945, which included Czechs or other non-Germans. In addition, most of the roughly 100,000 Carpathian Germans from Slovakia were evacuated on Himmler's orders to the Czechia region just before the end of the war. During April and May 1945, an estimated 1.6 million Germans from Polish Silesia fled the advancing Soviet forces and became refugees in Bohemia-Moravia. Thus according to German estimates there were 4.5 million German civilians present in Bohemia-Moravia in May 1945.

Chronology of the expulsions 
From London and Moscow, Czech and Slovak political agents in exile followed an advancing Soviet army pursuing German forces westward, to reach the territory of the first former Czechoslovak Republic. Beneš proclaimed the programme of the newly appointed Czechoslovak government on 5 April 1945, in the northeastern city of Košice, which included oppression and persecution of the non-Czech and non-Slovak populations of the partially restored Czechoslovak Republic. After the proclamation of the Košice program, the German and Hungarian population living in the reborn Czechoslovak state were subjected to various forms of  court procedures, citizenship revocations, property confiscation, condemnation to forced labour camps, and appointment of government managers to German and Hungarian owned businesses and farms, referred to euphemistically as "reslovakization".

Role of the Czechoslovak army 

Western Czechoslovakia was liberated by U.S. forces under General Patton. General Zdeněk Novák, head of the Prague military command "Alex", issued an order to "deport all Germans from territory within the historical borders."

A pamphlet issued on 5 June 1945 titled "Ten Commandments for Czechoslovak Soldiers in the Border Regions" directed soldiers that "The Germans have remained our irreconcilable enemies. Do not cease to hate the Germans ... Behave towards Germans like a victor ... Be harsh to the Germans ... German women and the Hitler Youth also bear the blame for the crimes of the Germans. Deal with them too in an uncompromising way."

On 15 June, a government decree directed the army to implement measures to apprehend Nazi criminals and carry out the transfer of the German population. On 27 July, the Ministry of National Defence issued a secret order directing the transfer should be carried out on as large a scale as possible, and as expeditiously as possible to present the Western powers with a fait accompli.

Beneš decrees 

Between 1945 and 1948, a series of Czechoslovak government decrees, edicts, laws and statutes were proclaimed by the president of the republic, the Prague-based Czechoslovak Parliament, the Slovak National Council (Parliament) in Bratislava and by the Board of Slovak Commissioners (an appendage of the Czechoslovak government in Bratislava).

Decrees 5, 12, 33, 108/1945 concerned the expropriation of wartime traitors and collaborators accused of treason but also all Germans and Hungarians. They also ordered the removal of citizenship from people of German and Hungarian ethnic origin who were treated collectively as collaborators (these provisions were cancelled for the Hungarians in 1948). This was then used to confiscate their property and expel around 90% of the ethnic German population of Czechoslovakia. These people were collectively accused of supporting the Nazis (through the Sudetendeutsche Partei (SdP), the political party led by Konrad Henlein) and the Third Reich's annexation of the Czech borderland in 1938. Decrees 33/1945 and 108/1945 explicitly stated that the sanctions did not apply to anti-fascists. Typically it was up to the decision of local municipalities. 160,000–250,000 Germans, some anti-fascists, but mostly people crucial for the industry remained in Czechoslovakia.

Massacres 
The 1945 expulsion was referred to as the "wild transfer" (divoký odsun) due to the widespread violence and brutality that were not only perpetuated by mobs but also by soldiers, police, and others acting under the color of authority. In the summer of 1945, for instance, there were localised massacres of the German population. The following examples are described in a study done by the European University Institute in Florence:
 18–19 June 1945, in the Přerov incident, 71 men, 120 women and 74 children (265 Germans) who were Carpathian Germans from Dobšiná were passing through Horní Moštěnice near Přerov railway station. Here they were taken out of the train by Czechoslovakian soldiers, taken outside the city to a hill named "Švédské šance", where they were forced to dig their own graves and all were shot. The massacre did not become publicly known until the fall of the Communist regime in 1989.
 20,000 Germans were forced to leave Brno for camps in Austria. Z. Beneš reported 800 deaths.
 Estimates of those killed in the Ústí massacre range from not less than 42 up to 2,000 civilians. Recent estimates range from 80 to 100 deaths.
 763 ethnic Germans were shot dead in and around Postelberg (now Postoloprty).

During the wild transfer phase, it is estimated that the number of murdered Germans was between 19,000 and 30,000. Accounts indicated that the Czechoslovak government was not averse to "popular justice" as long it did not excessively blacken the country's reputation abroad. There were even government officials who maintained that the massacres at Usti would not have happened if the government dealt with the Germans more harshly.

Internment camps 
According to the German "Society against Expulsion", some Germans were sent to what the society terms  "concentration camps". A 1964 report by the German Red Cross stated that 1,215 "internment camps" were established, as well as 846 forced labour and "disciplinary centres", and 215 prisons, on Czechoslovak territory. Special Courts sentenced 21,469 persons to prison and 713 were executed for crimes committed during the Nazi occupation. They made rough estimate claiming 350,000 Germans in Czechoslovakia passed through one or more of these institutions and 100,000 perished. However the Red Cross was able to confirm only 6,989 deaths in the internment camps.

According to Alfred de Zayas:

Expulsions 
Germans living in the border regions of Czechoslovakia were expelled from the country in late 1945. The joint German and Czech commission of historians estimated that there were about 15,000 violent deaths. Czech records report 15,000–16,000 deaths not including an additional 6,667 unexplained cases or suicides during the expulsion, and others died from hunger and illness in Germany as a consequence. In 1946, an estimated 1.3 million ethnic Germans were deported to the American zone of what would become West Germany. An estimated 800,000 were deported to the Soviet zone (in what would become East Germany).

Act No. 115/1946 Coll. 
On 8 May 1946 the Czechoslovak provisional National Assembly passed Act No. 115/1946 Coll. It was enacted in conjunction with the Beneš decrees and it specifies that "Any act committed between 30 September 1938 and 28 October 1945 "the object of which was to aid the struggle for liberty of the Czechs and Slovaks or which represented just reprisals for actions of the occupation forces and their accomplices", is not illegal, even when such acts may otherwise be punishable by law." This law, which is still in force, has de facto ensured that no atrocities against Germans during the time-period in question have been prosecuted in Czechoslovakia.

However, the Czech government did express its regret in the 1997 Joint Czech–German Declaration on the Mutual Relations and their Future Development:

Results 
The joint Czech–German commission of historians in 1996 stated the following numbers: the deaths caused by violence and abnormal living conditions amount approximately to 10,000 persons killed; another 5,000–6,000 persons died of unspecified reasons related to expulsion; making the total number of victims of the expulsion 15,000–16,000 (this excludes suicides, which make another approximately 3,400 cases).

The Communist Party controlled the distribution of seized German assets, contributing to its popularity in the border areas, where it won 75 percent of votes in the 1946 election. Without these votes, the Communist Party would not have achieved a plurality in the Czech lands. The expulsions of Germans are therefore considered a key factor in the success of the 1948 coup.

Long-term impact 
According to a 2020 study, the expulsion of the Germans triggered a depopulation and de-urbanization of the border areas. Compared to adjacent areas outside the Sudetenland, fewer people work in high-skill sectors such as finance and healthcare. Significantly lower educational enrollment was first observed in 1947 and lower educational achievement is still evident from the results of the 2011 Czech census.

Legacy 
The UN Human Rights Committee issued decisions in three cases concerning Sudeten Germans (Des Fours Walderode v. Czech Republic; Petzoldova v. Czech Republic; Czernin v. Czech Republic) in which violations of articles 26 and 14 of the International Covenant on Civil and Political Rights were established and the Czech Republic was ordered to return the property to the rightful owners. As of 2010, the committee's views had not been implemented.

Public opinion surveys indicate that the public is opposed to such measures.

According to an article in the Prague Daily Monitor:

In the Czech–German Declaration of August, 1997:
 

German politicians and the deported Sudeten Germans widely use the word "expulsion" for the events. However, political representatives in both the Czech Republic and Poland, from where millions of Germans had to move after WW2, usually avoid this expression and rather use the word deportation.

Compensation to expellees 
The British Foreign Office and the U.S. State Department planned a "population transfer commission" similar to the arrangement in the Treaty of Lausanne of 1923 to provide compensation for private property to transferred Greeks and Turks following the Kemalist war of 1919–1923. But events went faster and the expulsions began in May 1945, long before the Potsdam Conference and before any agreement on a commission had been settled. No population transfer commission with competence to evaluate the claims of the German expellees was ever established. (See Public Record Office documents FO 371/46810 and FO 371/46811).

Since the Czechoslovak government-in-exile decided that population transfer was the only solution of the German question, the problem of reparation (war indemnity) was closely associated. The proposed population transfer as presented in negotiations with the governments of U.S., UK and U.S.S.R., presumed the confiscation of the Germans' property to cover the reparation demands of Czechoslovakia; then Germany should pay the compensation to satisfy its citizens. This fait accompli was to prevent Germany's evasion of reparation payment as happened after World War I.

This plan was suggested to the Inter-Allied Reparation Agency (IARA) in 1945, but because of the advent of the Cold War was never confirmed by any treaty with Germany. The IARA ended its activity in 1959 and the status quo is as follows: Czech Republic kept the property of expelled ethnic Germans while Germany did not pay any reparations (only about 0.5% of Czechoslovak demands were satisfied ). For this reason, every time the Sudeten Germans request compensation or the abolition of the Beneš decrees, the Czech side strikes back by the threat of reparation demands.
 
Even during the preparation of the Czech–German declaration, the German side avoided the Czech demand to confirm the status quo by the agreement. However, Germany adopted the Czechoslovak fait accompli and has paid compensation to the expellees. One source claims the German government paid about 141bn DM to the expellees until 1993. Other sources state an overall amount of roughly 60bn EUR paid out as partial compensation to all citizens of Germany and ethnic-German expellees — a group of 15m people alone — affected by property loss due to consequences of the war. The payout to Germans from Czechoslovakia can be assumed to represent a much smaller fraction of that sum.

In contrast to Germany, the issue of compensation of expellees was, at least nominally, closed by several treaties with Austria and Hungary. The most important follow:
 Treaty of 3 February 1964: According to this treaty, Czechoslovakia pledged to satisfy all demands of Hungary and Hungarian citizens related to confiscations by paying 20,000,000 Kčs.
 Treaty of 19 December 1974: According to this treaty, Czechoslovakia pledged to pay 1,000,000,000 ATS to cover the property demands of Austrian citizens and waived all former territory and all other demands of country or individuals against Austria. The Austrian side waived all demands against ČSSR and pledged to not support any demands of individuals against the ČSSR related to expulsion.

Incidents 
 Ústí massacre
 Brno death march

References

Further reading 
 Execution of German Civilians in Prague (9 May 1945) (Czech TV documentary, perpetration disputed) (Adobe Flash Player, 2:32 min)
 Bracey, S. (2019). "The Symmetry of Hypocrisy in Czech-German Legal Conciliation, 1989–1997." Central European History, 52 (3), 496–526. 

 R.M. Douglas: Orderly and Humane. The Expulsion of the Germans after the Second World War. Yale University Press, 2012. .

 Tomáš Staněk Internierung und Zwangsarbeit: das Lagersystem in den böhmischen Ländern 1945–1948 (Originaltitel: Tábory v českých zemích 1945–1948, übersetzt von Eliška und Ralph Melville, ergänzt und aktualisiert vom Autor, mit einer Einführung von Andreas R. Hofmann) Oldenbourg / Collegium Carolinum, München 2007,  /  (= Veröffentlichungen des Collegium Carolinum, Band 92).
 Tomáš Staněk, Verfolgung 1945: die Stellung der Deutschen in Böhmen, Mähren und Schlesien (außerhalb der Lager und Gefängnisse), übersetzt von Otfrid Pustejovsky, bearbeitet und teilweise übersetzt von Walter Reichel, Böhlau, Wien / Köln / Weimar 2002,  (= Buchreihe des  Institutes für den Donauraum und Mitteleuropa, Band 8).

Sudetenland
Aftermath of World War II in Germany
German diaspora in Europe
1940s in Czechoslovakia
Czechoslovakia
Czechoslovakia in World War II
Czech Republic–Germany relations
Germany–Slovakia relations
Czechoslovakia–Germany relations
Germans